Thole v. US Bank, (2020), was a case in which the Supreme Court of the United States held that statutory 'cause of action to sue' does not satisfy Article III standing requirements; plaintiffs must have suffered concrete and particularized injury.

See also 
 List of United States Supreme Court cases involving standing

References

United States Supreme Court cases
2020 in United States case law
United States standing case law